Old Stockbridge Grist Mill is a historic grist mill on Country Way in Scituate, Massachusetts.  It is one of the oldest surviving mills in the United States.

Between 1637 and 1640, the First Herring Brook was dammed by Isaac Stedman for creation of a sawmill. In 1650, John Stockbridge built next to the sawmill the surviving grist mill, which was used by the Stockbridge and Clapp families to grind cornmeal for sale until 1922, when the Scituate Historical Society purchased the property. Much of the original mill grinding equipment still survives within the mill.

References

Scituate, Massachusetts
1650 establishments in Massachusetts
Mill museums in Massachusetts
Grinding mills in Massachusetts